Arthur Santa Rita da Lima (born 25 May 1986), commonly known as Arthur, is a Brazilian footballer who last played for Concórdia.

Club career
Arthur started his career with São Paulo, making one Campeonato Brasileiro Série A appearance in 2005. He traveled with the squad for friendly games in New Delhi in 2007.

His next professional game would come in 2009 for Bragantino, when he came on as a 61st-minute substitute for Sandro Costa da Silva in a 4–1 away win against América Futebol Clube in the 2009 Série B.

International career
Arthur represented Brazil at the 2003 FIFA U-17 World Championship, playing in two games - both as a substitute - as his side were crowned champions.

Career statistics

Club

Notes

References

1986 births
Living people
Brazilian footballers
Brazilian expatriate footballers
Association football midfielders
São Paulo FC players
Iraty Sport Club players
Rio Branco Sport Club players
Sheikh Russel KC players
Clube Atlético Bragantino players
Associação Atlética Flamengo players
Campeonato Brasileiro Série A players
Campeonato Brasileiro Série B players
Expatriate footballers in Bangladesh
Footballers from São Paulo